Björn Johan Andrésen (born 26 January 1955) is a Swedish actor and musician. He is best known for playing the 14-year-old Tadzio in Luchino Visconti's 1971 film adaptation of the 1912 Thomas Mann novella Death in Venice. He also played a minor role in Ari Aster's 2019 folk horror film Midsommar.

Early life
Andrésen's father has never been identified and his mother, Barbro Elisabeth Andrésen, took her own life when he was 10 years old. He was then brought up by his maternal grandparents. Part of his schooling was at a boarding school in Denmark. As a student Andrésen attended the Adolf Fredrik's Music School in Stockholm.

Career
Andrésen had only appeared in one film, En kärlekshistoria (1970), at the time he was cast in Death in Venice, which gained him international recognition. Andrésen's role was as Tadzio, the beautiful young Polish boy with whom the film's older protagonist Gustav von Aschenbach (played by Dirk Bogarde) becomes obsessed. Film historian Lawrence J. Quirk commented in his study The Great Romantic Films (1974) that some shots of Andrésen "could be extracted from the frame and hung on the walls of the Louvre or the Vatican". Following the Cannes Film Festival a year after the premiere of Death in Venice, Andrésen received international headlines as "the most beautiful boy in the world".

Andrésen later described his discomfort with his role in Death in Venice and its director Luchino Visconti, stating that "When I watch it now, I see how that son of a bitch sexualized me." At the time of the film's release, rumours circulated in the United States that Andrésen was gay (as the role demanded that he appear to exchange romantic glances with the protagonist, and on another occasion, be kissed and caressed by another teenage boy), which Andrésen emphatically denied. After the film's premiere, Visconti pressured Andrésen to attend a gay club, where he was made uncomfortable by the staring of adult men; Andrésen later described the experience as "hell". 

Eager to dispel the rumours regarding his sexuality and to shed his "pretty boy" image, Andrésen avoided homosexual roles and parts which he felt would play off his good looks, and was irritated when feminist writer Germaine Greer used a photograph of him on the cover of her book The Beautiful Boy (2003) without his permission. Greer consulted photographer David Bailey (who owned the copyright for the image) before publishing the book. Andrésen maintained that it is common practice when a party uses an image of a person which has been copyrighted by a different individual to inform the individual and that he would not have given his consent for Greer to use his picture if she had informed him of her plans.

After the release of Death in Venice, Andrésen spent an extended period of time in Japan and appeared in a number of television commercials and also recorded several pop songs. It is said that his appearance as Tadzio in the film influenced many Japanese anime artists (known for their depictions of young, beautiful men known as "Bishōnen"), especially Keiko Takemiya. Andrésen has had a strong liking for Japan since then and has visited the country again over the years. Björn Andrésen's arrival in Tokyo has been described as being similar to the Beatles landing in the U.S. The young actor was met with mass hysteria and received an enormous amount of female attention.

Andrésen has appeared in several other films.  These include Smugglarkungen (1985), Kojan (1992), Pelikaanimies (2004), and Midsommar (2019).

In addition to being an actor, Andrésen is a professional musician, and until recently performed and toured regularly with the Sven Erics dance band. In 2021 Andrésen was the focus of The Most Beautiful Boy in the World, a documentary detailing his experiences post-fame after the premiere of Death in Venice.

Personal life
Andrésen resides in Stockholm. He has a daughter, Robine (b. 1984), with his ex-wife, the poet Susanna Roman (m. 1983-1987). Andrésen and his ex-wife Susanna had another child, a son named Elvin, who died of sudden infant death syndrome at 9 months of age. Andrésen fell into a long depression following the death of his son. In an interview in 2020, Andrésen stated that he believes he will meet his son again "in the afterlife". Andrésen has two grandchildren, a boy and a girl.

Filmography
 1970 – A Swedish Love Story (Swedish: En kärlekshistoria)
 1971 – Death in Venice
 1977 – 
 1982 – The Simple-Minded Murderer (Swedish: Den enfaldige mördaren)
 1982 – One-Week Bachelors (Swedish: Gräsänklingar)
 1985 – 
 1986 – 
 1987 – 
 1989 – Dandelion Children (Swedish: Maskrosbarn)
 1989 –  (TV series)
 1990 – A la recherche de Tadzio (9 minute documentary directed by Étienne Faure with film and interview of Andrésen)
 1990 – Lucifer - Late summer yellow and black (Swedish: Lucifer – Sensommer gult og sort)
 1991 – Agnes Cecilia – en sällsam historia [Agnes Cecilia - a strange story ]
 1993 – 
 1994 – Rederiet [High Seas or The Shipping Company] (TV series)
 2004 – Pelican Men (Swedish: Pelikanmannen)
 2004 – 
 2005 – Lasermannen (TV series) [The Laserman]
 2006 –  (Swedish: Världarnas bok) (TV series)
 2010 – Wallander – Arvet [The Heritage]
 2016–2017 – Spring Tide (TV series) (Swedish: Springfloden)
 2016 – Shelley
 2017 – Jordskott (TV series)
 2019 – Midsommar
 2021 –  – Oscar

Documentaries 
 2016: Hotellet [The Hotel]
 2021: The Most Beautiful Boy in the World

See also

Notes

References

Further reading
 Dye, David. Child and Youth Actors: Filmography of Their Entire Careers, 1914-1985. Jefferson, NC: McFarland & Co., 1988, p. 6.
 Holmstrom, John. The Moving Picture Boy: An International Encyclopaedia from 1895 to 1995. Norwich, Michael Russell, 1996, p. 308–309.

External links

 
 

1955 births
Living people
Swedish male film actors
Swedish male child actors
Male actors from Stockholm